Reckless is contemporary Christian musician Jeremy Camp's ninth studio album, and the producers are Camp and Andy Dodd. The album was released on February 12, 2013, which all of his album has been released on BEC Recordings label, and this is his eighth album with the label. The first single from the album is entitled "Reckless", which was released on November 16, 2012, and has achieved chart success. Lastly, this album marks the ninth album of Camp's career that includes his first independent release. For the week of March 2, 2013, the album was the No. 31 most sold album in the nation via the Billboard 200 chart, which the album was the No. 10 most popular Rock album in the same week, and it was the most popular Christian album, as well.

Background

Communicate
Jeremy Camp gave an interview to Worship Leader and was asked "What do you hope to communicate with Reckless?"

Production
In addition, Jeremy Camp was asked the question in the same interview with Worship Leader that "In terms of production, what did you feel was most importantly communicated in the album? What aspect did you want to stand out the most?"

Process
Lastly, Jeremy Camp was asked the question in the same interview with Worship Leader that "How does being reckless describe surrendering your life to Christ?"

Critical reception

Reckless has achieved generally favorable ratings from the reviewers. The album Reckless got positive reviews from the following publications: About.com, AllMusic, Christian Broadcasting Network, Christian Music Review, Christian Music Zine, CM Addict, Cross Rhythms, Louder Than the Music, New Release Tuesday, ONCOURSE MAGAZINE and Worship Leader magazine. However, Reckless got some mixed reviews from the following publications: CCM Magazine, Indie Vision Music, and both Jesus Freak Hideout reviewers. On the other hand, the album has yet to receive any negative review, so far. The album had the most positive review come from CM Addict David Bunce, who rated it four-and-a-half-stars-out-of-five, and evoked how "This album is packed with a powerful punch that, I would say, has been unparalleled in any of the other great works Camp has produced in the past. Amidst the quality produced sound and familiar vocals we have grown accustomed to, this album ratchets up the passion and soul that makes Christian music so powerful." The worst rating given to this album was by Alex "Tincan" Caldwell of Jesus Freak Hideout, who rated the album a two-and-a-half-out-of-five-stars, and wrote that "But by and large, Reckless rehashes similar musical and lyrical themes over and over again, and they are themes and melodies that Camp has hit many times before on previous records. This is a shame, because Camp comes across as a man with a large heart for ministry and a passion for the Lord that is undeniable. But Reckless is Camp's 5th album of original material, and there's nothing really original on it."

The album was rated four-stars-out-of-five by About.com, Christian Music Review, Christian Music Zine, New Release Tuesday and ONCOURSE MAGAZINE. Kim Jones of About.com noted that "Solid vocals, just enough rock and a message that we can all relate to on whatever level we're currently at – it's not reinventing the wheel but it's still very, very important. That's what you get with Reckless." Laura Chambers of Christian Music Review said that "Without a doubt, Reckless will leave you breathless." Furthermore, Christian Music Zine's Joshua Andre wrote that "While musically Reckless is more aggressive than the previous album We Cry Out, it still however doesn't match the intensity of albums such as Stay and Speaking Louder Than Before. Yet maybe this is a good thing. It means that Jeremy is evolving in his sound, and doing music from a place that is not duty or expectations, but of his own heart and his walk with Jesus his songs do still sound as passionate as ever. The result is 11 tracks of brutal honesty, with the heart behind the songs still present." Andre called it "an enjoyable album." Kevin Davis of New Release Tuesday alluded to how "Camp's newest album Reckless has a cohesiveness and spiritual maturity that I can hear in every song." In addition, Davis wrote that the album is "Filled with passionate songs birthed in the furnace of worship, prayer and intercession, Jeremy Camp's new studio album Reckless is a powerful experience calling the body of Christ to a revival and restoration in Christ with eleven brand new original songs." Davis noted that "this album displays a softer adult contemporary musical style. The album is filled with messages of hope, confession and worship to our great God and Savior. Jeremy Camp's enthusiastic and reverent style of writing and singing praise and worship songs has consistently been a draw for me. Camp's prayerful sentiments are consistently filled with his personal adoration of God. Reckless is no exception." Shoji McGhee of ONCOURSE MAGAZINE found that "Thematically Reckless remains true to what Jeremy Camp fans would expect. It is a pop-rock worship album born from Jeremy's personal experiences with God. You will be encouraged and challenged, reminded of God's love and called to act upon that great love."

Reckless was rated three-and-a-half-stars-out-of-five by AllMusic, Christian Broadcasting Network, Louder Than the Music and Worship Leader magazine, and it was rated a seven-out-of-ten by Cross Rhythms. To this, Thom Jurek of AllMusic wrote that "This is music that thrives on soaring choruses, tight hooks, gradual yet sweeping dynamic changes, etc. Its purpose is to stir emotion. Still, there is a question that registers a complaint: why are there no songs that express the truly human vulnerability in a life of faith that Camp so readily and beautifully expressed in his riveting autobiography I Still Believe in 2011? That aside, if you've found Camp's music compelling in the past, Reckless likely won't disappoint. Still, here's hoping that vulnerability comes into his music at some point." Hannah Goodwyn of Christian Broadcasting Network evoked that themes of the album are that of "declaring God's greatness, His relevance and radical love. Reckless leads us in a worshipful response to God 'till the world comes alive'. The album isn't mind-blowingly inventive, musically speaking. But, Reckless has some instrumental surprises along the way. Listen intently to the lyrics, and you'll get lost in the songs' awakening power." Louder Than the Music' Jono Davies noted that "Jeremy has produced another solid album, with some great songs that his fans will really get into. You can't deny the structural quality of the album. Lyrically there are some amazing truths coming out of the songs. Jeremy's vocals sound as good as I have heard them, and the production of the album is, as you would expect, very, very good. If you're looking for a solid album and are a fan of Jeremy's work then Reckless is definitely for you." Worship Leader magazine's Lindsay Young said the best part of the album is "Camp's fervent heart for ministry and for God is evident through the songs and the production of the album. Reckless is honest and heartfelt, and carries some songs that would be useful in the church." On the other hand, the worst part is that "There are times when an adjustment in instrumental arrangement and musicality would make the record stronger and more dynamic." At Cross Rhythms, Tony Cummings wrote that "All in all, this is an album which will find support from Camp's existing fans who probably won't even register the generic quality of many of the pop rock arrangements."

The album got three-stars-out-of-five by CCM Magazine, Indie Vision Music, and Roger Gelwicks of Jesus Freak Hideout. Matt Conner of CCM Magazine noted that "The pop/rock anthems on Reckless...resonate like his many hits to date, and fans should instantly swarm to new tunes like 'My God' and the title track." Indie Vision Music's Jonathan Andre illustrated that "Despite a few hiccups within the song lineup ("Free" in particular), Jeremy has delivered a solid album anchored by the title track and how as we become more immersed in Christ and His unending and unequivocal love for us, the struggle that we sometimes can feel as we become more reckless for Him will become less of a struggle and more of a joy, both felt by ourselves and God in the whole process of abandoning every part of ourselves at His feet and trusting in the outcome- good or bad (as we perceive it)." Plus, Andre wrote that "Jeremy has done a great job in preparing and giving listeners a well deserved album full of enjoyableness and encouragement." Roger Gelwicks of Jesus Freak Hideout noted how "The rock-tinged pop singer isn't finished yet; inspired by the call to lay down everything to follow Christ, Reckless aims to hold nothing back, even if the musical result isn't as demonstrative of its title." Consequently, Gelwicks criticized that "Despite some strong points, however, a lack of musical or lyrical complexity troubles some areas of Reckless. With a career spanning over twelve years with accolades galore, Camp is one of the more experienced songwriters in the business, but some of the fruits of his labors don't show it very evidently on Reckless." In closing, Gelwicks said that "While Jeremy Camp is thankfully still in the business of writing authentic songs that are unashamed in their inspiration, Reckless isn't among Camp's best work. After the first couple tracks, Reckless declines in the areas of exceptionality, and the few bright spots scattered throughout the project aren't quite enough to save the album from the 'ordinary' category. Camp's career can afford to take more risks than are demonstrated on Reckless, and perhaps his next effort will see the musical revival his talent deserves."

Commercial performance
Reckless was the No. 31 most sold album in the United States for the week of March 2, 2013 on the Billboard 200 chart. In addition, the album was the tenth most sold via Billboard Rock Albums chart, and it was the best selling on the Christian Albums chart in the same week.  The album has sold 41,000 copies in the US as of February 2015.

Track listing

Personnel

Musicians
 Jeremy Camp – lead and backing vocals, additional piano
 Andy Dodd – keyboards, programming, guitars, backing vocals 
 Tom Bukovac – guitars
 Toby Friesen – electric guitar on "Free"
 Tony Lucido – bass
 Dan Needham – drums
 John Catchings – cello on "Reign in Me"
 Luke Brown – backing vocals

Production 
 Produced by Jeremy Camp and Andy Dodd
 Recorded and Mixed by Andy Dodd at Red Decibel East (Nashville, TN).
 Drums, bass and additional guitars recorded by Ben Phillips at Superphonic (Nashville, TN).
 Mastered by Stephen Marcussen at Marcussen Mastering (Los Angeles, CA).
 A&R – Conor Farley
 Management – Matt Balm
 Art Direction – Invisible Creature, Inc.
 Design – Ryan Clark for Invisible Creature, Inc.
 Photography by Lee Steffen

Charts

References

2013 albums
BEC Recordings albums
Jeremy Camp albums